Nico Willig (born 11 December 1980) is a German football coach who last was the caretaker manager of VfB Stuttgart.

Coaching career
Willig began his coaching career at TSG Balingen, where he was the manager for the 2013/14 season before leaving the club. In the summer of 2015, Willig then became manager of the under-19 team of Stuttgarter Kickers. In January 2016, he moved to the youth department of VfB Stuttgart and became manager of the club's U16's. A half year later, he was promoted to U17 manager, which he was until the summe 2018, where he took charge of the U19's.

On 20 April 2019, Willig took over as Head coach of VfB Stuttgart on interim basis until the end of the 2018–19 Bundesliga season.

References

1980 births
Living people
German football managers
Bundesliga managers
VfB Stuttgart managers
TSG Balingen players
Sportspeople from Tübingen
Footballers from Baden-Württemberg
German footballers
Association football defenders